James Allen Workman (17 March 1917 – 23 December 1970) was an Australian cricketer who played first-class cricket for the Australian Services team from May 1945 to January 1946.

After the war he married an English woman, and they lived in London, where he coached at Alf Gover's cricket school. He died suddenly on his way home from work on 23 December 1970.

References

External links

1917 births
1970 deaths
Australian cricketers
Australian Services cricketers
Cricketers from Adelaide
Royal Australian Air Force personnel of World War II
Australian cricket coaches
Royal Australian Air Force airmen
Australian emigrants to the United Kingdom